Lazer Us: The Legend of Jimi Lazer is an independent film by CubeCity Entertainment and Curium Films. Originally titled The Legend of Jimi Lazer, it won "Best Film - Adventure Category" at the Manhattan Film Festival and screened at Toronto's Reel Indie Film Festival. Its new name was unveiled for the DVD release in 2014. The film stars Robbie Beniuk, Patrick J. Mitchell, Amy Landon, Elijah Black, Robert Tanos, Tanya Lynne, Christopher Elliott, and Jim Yorfido.

Written and produced by Roberto Munoz, the story is inspired by his days in the music industry. In the 1980s, Munoz managed the alternative Gospel band, Level Heads, featuring Juno award-winning musician, Jim Chevalier. He promoted such acts as Phil Keaggy and Second Chapter of Acts, and Freedom 88, a three-day alternative Gospel Music festival at Bingeman Park in Kitchener, Ontario with Steve Taylor, Adam Again, and The Choir.

Plot
Jimi Lazer, front-man guitarist of the up-and-coming rock band LAZER US, gets wind of a magical guitar. He pays a visit to the Hex who reveals the steep price of such a deal. Realizing she won’t let him back out, he now lives under a curse. Jimi takes the guitar and disappears. No one hears from him again. Twenty-seven long years pass. Jimi's old band manager, Freedom, arrives in a beat-up old van. He tells Jimi that he has had a dream where Jimi was playing music with the Man in Black. He and Jimi set out on a mad-cap chase to re-assemble the magical guitar before the Guitar Hunter does. With the help of his former bandmates, Righty and Red, and a new face, Zmoothie, they set out to break the curse once and for all.

Cast
 Robbie Beniuk as Jimi Lazer
 Patrick J. Mitchell as Freedom
 Amy Landon as Zmoothie
 Elijah Black as Righty
 Robert Tanos as Red
 Tanya Lynne as the Hex
 Christopher Elliott as the Guitar Hunter
 Jim Yorfido as the Man in Black

Awards 
2013 Manhattan Film Festival
Best Film - Adventure Category

References

External links
 
 

2013 films
American adventure films
Canadian adventure films
English-language Canadian films
2010s adventure films
2010s English-language films
Films directed by Mann Munoz
2010s American films
2010s Canadian films